The 2000 metres or 2000-metre run is a track running event where five laps are completed around an outdoor 400 m track, or ten laps around a 200 m indoor track - the distance is 11.68 meters short of 1¼ miles. 

The global governing body World Athletics recognises official world records for the distance, and it is also recorded in continental and national record settings. The men's world record is held by Morocco's Hicham El Guerrouj, who ran a time of 4:44.79 in 1999, while the women's world record is held by Ethiopia's Genzebe Dibaba who ran a time of 5:23.75 in 2017. 

The distance regularly features on event programmes of professional one-day track and field meetings, serving as a comparatively novel event with greater scope for record-breaking performances. It is also used at lower level competitions, such as school and youth tournaments.

Despite its world record status, it has not yet featured as a world championship level event indoors or outdoors: the event was briefly held at national level in the mid-1960s at the Spanish Indoor and Soviet Indoor Athletics Championships.

Records

World records

Continental records

All-time top 15

Men 
Correct as of February 2023.

Notes
Below is a list of other times equal or superior to 4:51.30:
Hicham El Guerrouj also ran 4:48.36 (1998) and 4:51.17 (2001).
Vénuste Niyongabo also ran 4:49.00 (1997).
Noureddine Morceli also ran 4:49.55 (1996).

Women 
Correct as of September 2021.

Notes
Below is a list of other times equal or superior to 5:30.19:
Genzebe Dibaba also ran 5:27.50 (2014).

References

General
Records by Event 2000 metres. World Athletics. Retrieved 2020-07-05.

Events in track and field
Middle-distance running